Monkey Business  is a 1952 American screwball comedy film directed by Howard Hawks, written by Ben Hecht, and starring Cary Grant, Ginger Rogers, Charles Coburn and Marilyn Monroe. To avoid confusion with the unrelated 1931 Marx Brothers film of the same name, this film is sometimes referred to as Howard Hawks' Monkey Business.

Plot

Dr. Barnaby Fulton (Cary Grant), an absent-minded research chemist for the Oxly chemical company, is trying to develop an elixir of youth.  He is urged on by his commercially minded boss, Oliver Oxly (Charles Coburn). One of Dr. Fulton's chimpanzees, Esther, gets loose in the laboratory, mixes a beaker of chemicals, and pours the mix into the water cooler. The chemicals have the rejuvenating effect Fulton is seeking.

Unaware of Esther's antics, Fulton tests his latest experimental concoction on himself and washes it down with water from the cooler. He soon begins to act like a 20-year-old and spends the day out on the town with his boss's secretary, Lois Laurel (Marilyn Monroe). When Fulton's wife, Edwina (Ginger Rogers), learns that the elixir "works", she drinks some along with water from the cooler and turns into a prank-pulling schoolgirl.

Edwina makes an impetuous phone call to her old flame, the family lawyer, Hank Entwhistle (Hugh Marlowe). Her mother, who knows nothing of the elixir, believes that Edwina is truly unhappy in her marriage and wants a divorce.

Barnaby takes more elixir and befriends a group of kids playing as make-believe "Indians" (Native Americans).  They capture and "scalp" Hank (giving him a Mohawk hairstyle), later fleeing when police show up. Meanwhile, Edwina lies down to sleep off the formula. Meanwhile, a woman leaves her baby with the Fultons' housekeeper as she needs an emergency babysitter. When Edwina awakens, a naked baby is next to her and Barnaby's clothes are nearby. She mistakenly presumes he has taken too much formula and regressed to a baby. She takes the child to Oxly to resolve the problem. Together the two attempt to find an antidote and when the baby grows sleepy, Edwina tries to put him to sleep in the hopes of reversing the effects.

Meanwhile, more and more scientists (and Mr. Oxly) at the laboratory are drinking the water and reverting to a second childhood. The formula is lost with the last of the water poured away. As the water is poured away, Barnaby crawls into the laboratory through the window and lies down to sleep next to the baby. Edwina later discovers him and realizes her mistake with the baby. Later at home as Barnaby and Edwina are planning to go out, their spirits and marriage renewed, Barnaby notes that "you're old only when you forget you're young."

Cast

 Cary Grant as Dr. Barnaby Fulton
 Ginger Rogers as Edwina Fulton
 Marilyn Monroe as Lois Laurel
 Charles Coburn as Oliver Oxly
 Hugh Marlowe as Hank Entwhistle
 Henri Letondal as Dr. Jerome Kitzel
 Robert Cornthwaite as Dr. Zoldeck
 Larry Keating as G.J. Culverly
 Douglas Spencer as Dr. Brunner
 Esther Dale as Mrs. Rhinelander
 George Winslow as Little Indian
 Kathleen Freeman as Mrs. Brannigan
 Harry Carey Jr as Reporter (uncredited)
 Howard Hawks as the voice at the start of the movie that says to Cary Grant not to open the door yet (uncredited)

Reception

Critical response
Review aggregation website Rotten Tomatoes gives the film an approval rating of 79% based on 28 reviews and an average score of 6.8/10.

Hawks said he did not think the film's premise was believable, and as a result thought the film was not as funny as it could have been. Peter Bogdanovich has noted that the scenes with Cary Grant and Marilyn Monroe work especially well and laments that Monroe was not the leading lady instead of Ginger Rogers. However, Gregory Lamb of The Christian Science Monitor described Rogers as "a comedienne par excellence" in the film.

The Washington Star was disappointed: "Dreary business is what it really is. Farce writing can be a treacherous trade...and not even the insurance represented by Miss Rogers, Grant, and Marilyn Monroe can provide adequate protection in cases like 'Monkey Business'...Miss Rogers and Grant, a pair of gifted farceurs, earn a kind of grudging admiration for giving such a courageous try at such unrewarding material as 'Monkey Business' provides them...In the presence of such silky performers as the picture's veterans, [Monroe's] acting has apparently climbed no higher than one degree above zero but no one will care."

References

External links

 
 
 
 
 
 
 Historic reviews, photo gallery at CaryGrant.net

1952 films
1952 comedy films
1950s American films
1950s English-language films
1950s science fiction comedy films
1950s screwball comedy films
20th Century Fox films
American black-and-white films
American science fiction comedy films
American screwball comedy films
Films directed by Howard Hawks
Films produced by Sol C. Siegel
Films scored by Leigh Harline
Films with screenplays by Ben Hecht
Films with screenplays by Charles Lederer
Films with screenplays by I. A. L. Diamond